Marina Vasilievna Kovtun (born 10 March 1962) is a Russian politician who was Governor of Murmansk Oblast from April 2012 until March 2019. She worked in various Murmansk government agencies, including tourism management, prior to her appointment to the governorship in April 2012. Kovtun was the first female leader of Murmansk Oblast.

Biography
Kovtun was born in Murmansk. In 2001 she was graduated from North-West Academy for State Services as a specialist in Municipal and State Management. From 1986 she worked in the Murmansk District Committee of the Komsomol, and she was the head of Kola District.

From 1994 to 2005 she worked as deputy chairman of the Physical Culture, Sport and Tourism Committee for the Administration of Murmansk Oblast.

From 2005 she was the Chief Deputy of the local Department of the Federal Tourism Agency.

From 2006 til 2009 she led the Department for Tourism Development of the Directorate for Economics in the Murmansk Oblast Administration.

Until 2011 she was the deputy chairman of the "Kola GMK" Company.

In December 2011 she was elected to the Murmansk Oblast Duma, and she was the First Deputy of the Chairman of Murmansk Oblast Duma.

Governor of Murmansk
In April 2012, Russian president Dmitry Medvedev appointed Kovtun as acting governor of Murmansk Oblast, when the previous governor, Dmitry Dmitriyenko, resigned from office.

References

1962 births
Living people
Governors of Murmansk Oblast
People from Murmansk
United Russia politicians
21st-century Russian politicians
Women heads of federal subjects of Russia
Recipients of the Medal of the Order "For Merit to the Fatherland" II class
21st-century Russian women politicians
Northwestern Management Institute alumni